Joseph Clarke,  (born 3 November 1992) is a British slalom canoeist who has competed at the international level since 2009, specializing in the K1 event. He is the 2016 Olympic champion in the K1 event and has won medals at World and European Championships.

Early life
Clarke was born in Stoke-on-Trent, Staffordshire. He first tried canoeing during a trip with The Scout Association at the age of eight. He then applied to join the Stafford and Stone Canoe Club, but was rejected for being too young. He was given the chance to reapply through his middle school's canoeing club during year six at Walton Priory Middle School, but as they only had eight places available which were greatly oversubscribed he was required to write a letter to demonstrate why he deserved a place. His application was successful and he began training with the club, competing in his first race in 2004 at the age of 11. Clarke supports local team Stoke City F.C.

Clarke attended Alleyne's Academy high school, after going to his middle school Walton Priory Middle School. At the age of 15 he contracted bacterial meningitis which caused an abscess behind one eye. He was in hospital for two weeks and was treated with intravenous antibiotics, after which he made a full recovery.

Career
Clarke made his debut for the British junior team in 2009, winning junior European Championship silver medals in the K1 team event in 2009 and 2010. He has trained at the Lee Valley White Water Centre since 2012.

He won a European Championship under-23 silver medal in the individual K1 in 2013, and World Championship silver medals in the under-23 team event in 2013 and 2014.

At senior level, he won six medals at the ICF Canoe Slalom World Championships with three golds (Extreme K1: 2021, 2022, K1 team: 2018), one silver (K1 team: 2022) and two bronzes (K1 team: 2014, 2015). He also won two silver and two bronze medals at the European Championships.

Clarke was selected for the 2016 Summer Olympics after winning the individual K1 at the British selection trials in October 2015. At the Olympics he qualified for the final of the K1 event with the third fastest time in the semi-final. He won gold in the final with a time of 88.53 seconds, the first time a British competitor had won gold in this event.

Clarke was appointed Member of the Order of the British Empire (MBE) in the 2017 New Year Honours for services to canoeing.

In 2018, Clarke guest starred in the third episode of the fourth series of the CBBC children cooking show Matilda and the Ramsay Bunch.

Clarke narrowly missed out on selection for the tokyo 2020 olympics. Following the postponement of the games, Clarke tried to force British Canoeing to abandon the selected athletes and have a new selection process for the olympic team. Unfortunately for Clarke this idea was rejected and British Canoeing have decided to stand by the existing team selection to allow these athletes to focus on the postponed games.

World Cup individual podiums

Results

2009

2010

2011

2012

2013

2014

2015

2016

References

External links

 
 
 

1992 births
English male canoeists
Living people
Sportspeople from Stoke-on-Trent
Canoeists at the 2016 Summer Olympics
Olympic canoeists of Great Britain
Olympic gold medallists for Great Britain
Medalists at the 2016 Summer Olympics
Olympic medalists in canoeing
British male canoeists
Members of the Order of the British Empire
Medalists at the ICF Canoe Slalom World Championships